Marios Zounis (born 20 February 2001) is a Greek professional footballer who plays as a forward for Super League club Atromitos.

References

2001 births
Living people
Greek footballers
Super League Greece 2 players
Atromitos F.C. players
Diagoras F.C. players
AO Chania F.C. players
Association football forwards
People from Rhodes
Sportspeople from the South Aegean